Venus Williams was the defending champion, but did not compete this year.

Kim Clijsters won the title by defeating Silvia Farina Elia 6–3, 6–0 in the final.

Seeds
The first five seeds received a bye into the second round.

Draw

Finals

Top half

Bottom half

References
 Official results archive (ITF)
 Official results archive (WTA)

2004 Singles
Proximus Diamond Games
Proximus Diamond Games